James Edmond Bruce, Sr. (August 17, 1927 – November 2, 2008) was a politician in the American state of Kentucky.

Bruce was the son of William Witt and Mossie (née Sharpe) Bruce, having been born in Morristown, Tennessee. In his early years, he attended the University of Tennessee and helped his father on the family's dairy farm. After the family sold the farm in 1940, they relocated to Christian County, Kentucky where they maintained another farm, and upon his father's death in 1975, James assumed operations of it.

He was elected to the Kentucky House of Representatives in 1963 as a Democrat, representing the 9th electoral district. Among the many committees he served on was the Banking and Insurance Committee, which he chaired. Upon his exit from the house in 2007, he was the longest-served state representative in the history of Kentucky.  Upon his retirement in 2007 he was honored in the United States House of Representatives by Rep. Ed Whitfield.

He married Jane Forbes Garnett in 1952 and had three children. They lived in Hopkinsville. The James E. Bruce Convention Center in Hopkinsville is named in his honor. In 2006, Bruce was hospitalized due to the effects of chronic inflammatory demyelinating polyradiculoneuropathy, which he had been suffering from for a year. He died at the age of 81 at his home, of natural causes, in 2008.

References

1927 births
2008 deaths
People from Christian County, Kentucky
People from Morristown, Tennessee
University of Tennessee alumni
Democratic Party members of the Kentucky House of Representatives
People from Hopkinsville, Kentucky
20th-century American politicians